The American Country Awards (ACA) was an annual country music awards show, entirely voted on by fans online. Created in 2010 by Fox, the awards honor country music artists for singles, albums, music videos and touring categories. In 2012, "Song of the Year" was added with the nominations coming from the Nashville Songwriters International Association. In addition to the CMA Awards, the ACM Awards, and the CMT Music Awards, it is the fourth major-awards show completely dedicated to the country music industry. The first two ceremonies took place at the MGM Grand Garden Arena in Las Vegas, Nevada on December 6, 2010 and December 5, 2011.

The 2012 ceremony took place at the Mandalay Bay Events Center in Las Vegas, on December 10. Luke Bryan won nine awards, including artist and album of the year, while Miranda Lambert won three. Carrie Underwood won female artist of the year and Lauren Alaina won new artist of the year. The show was executive produced by Bob Bain, produced by Paul Flattery, Tisha Fein, Kelly Brock and Fletcher Foster and directed by Michael Dempsey. 

The ceremony was discontinued after 2013; in 2014, Fox announced that it would air a different country music award ceremony, the American Country Countdown Awards—which were produced by Dick Clark Productions in partnership with Cumulus Media and its syndicated radio show American Country Countdown.

History
Nominees for the first inaugural awards show were announced on Monday October 18, 2010. Lady Antebellum and Easton Corbin led the field with seven nominations each, followed by Carrie Underwood with six nominations, and Miranda Lambert and Josh Turner each had five nominations. Voting continued through November 8, except for Artist of the Year; which closed on December 4. Trace Adkins was the host of the awards show. Winners in each category received a custom-made Fender guitar in lieu of trophies. In 2010, the guitar was the Stratocaster model, in 2011 it was the Telecaster.  At the 2010 ceremonies, Carrie Underwood was the top winner with 6 awards, including the first-ever Artist of the Year. Rascal Flatts received the Decade Award, Toby Keith received the Visionary Artist award and  Alan Jackson received the Greatest Hits Artist award. In 2011, Jason Aldean was the big winner with 6 Awards, including Artist of the year.  In 2012, Luke Bryan was the big winner with seven awards, including Artist of the year. Alabama received the Greatest Hits Artist award and Toby Keith was Artist of the Decade. The artist who has won the most ACAs is Carrie Underwood with 12 (6 in 2010, 3 in 2011, 2 in 2012, 1 in 2013) Luke Bryan has the most for a Male artist with 10 (7 in 2012, 3 in 2013) and Lady Antebellum has the most for a group with 9 (4 in 2010, 1 in 2011, 2 in 2012, 2 in 2013).

Fox co-branded its New Year's Eve Live special for 2011–12 with the American Country Awards as American Country New Year's Eve Live, which featured performances by Rodney Atkins, American Idol season 10 runner-up Lauren Alaina, the Eli Young Band, Joe Nichols, and Toby Keith.

2010

2011

2012

2013

Most wins
The artist who has won the most ACAs is Carrie Underwood with 12 (6 in 2010, 3 in 2011, 2 in 2012, 1 in 2013). Luke Bryan has the most for a Male artist with 10 (7 in 2012, 3 in 2013). Lady Antebellum has the most for a group with 9 (4 in 2010, 1 in 2011, 2 in 2012, 2 in 2013). In 2012, Luke Bryan won 7 Awards, including Artist of the year, the most wins in a single ceremony. He passed Jason Aldean with 7.

Carrie Underwood (12)
Luke Bryan (10)
Lady Antebellum (9)
Jason Aldean (8)
Blake Shelton (8)
Taylor Swift (4)
Miranda Lambert (2)

References

External links
 theacas.com - official homepage

American country music
Fox Broadcasting Company original programming
American music awards
Awards established in 2010
Country music awards